Richard Ashe may refer to:

Richard Ashe, director of Track of the Moon Beast
Richard Ashe (MP) for Trim (Parliament of Ireland constituency)

See also
Richard Ash (disambiguation)